La Trastienda Club is a prominent café-concert style venue in Buenos Aires.

The club was established in 1993 in a late 19th-century building originally housing a corner grocery in the Montserrat section of Buenos Aires. Seating 400 with standing-room capacity for another 1,000, its proximity to both downtown and the bohemian chic San Telmo section of the city has since helped make it one of the city's best known café-concerts and a leading local venue for artists in the world music, funk, jazz and other genres, featuring performers and bands from both Argentina and abroad.

Notable performances
George Clinton
Maceo Parker
Living Colour
Ed Motta
The National
Pavement
Elefant
Adrián Iaies
The Kooks
Medeski Martin & Wood
Bob Telson
Tarja Turunen
The Wailers
Damien Rice
McFly
Gilby Clarke
Mark Knopfler

References

Music venues in Argentina
Culture in Buenos Aires
Nightclubs
Buildings and structures in Buenos Aires
Commercial buildings completed in 1895
Music venues completed in 1993
1993 establishments in Argentina